According to Theravada Buddhism's Pali canon's Buddhavamsa and its commentary, Phussa is the twenty-first of twenty-seven Buddhas who preceded the historical Gotama Buddha. He was also the second Buddha of the Maṇḍa kalpa.

In the Buddhavamsa, he is described as:
Phussa Buddha removed the darkness, calmed the world and gave the Dhamma rain.
Phussa was 58 cubits, or 87 feet tall and was frequently compared with the sun and the moon.

Biography

From birth to Enlightenment 

Phussa was born in Kāsika. His parents were King Jayasena and Queen Sirimā. He was married to princess Kisāgotamī and reigned for 9,000 years. After his son, Anupama was born, he decided to go practise asceticism. He went away with his elephant cart and ten million men followed him to become ascetics. He practised asceticism for six months. After six months, he began to practise alone and become enlightened under the Maha Bodhi tree in the next morning.

Gotama Buddha Getting the omen
At Phussa's time, Gotama Buddha was a king named Vijitāvī. After listening to the teachings of Phussa, he gave away his possessions to become an ascetic. He could master the Pali canon. Phussa Buddha said "This king will become a Buddha named Gotama after 92 kalpas".The incarnation of Gotama Buddha, having his wish granted, extended his practices and became a god at Brahma realm.

Parinirvana 
Phussa lived for 90,000 years, liberating many living beings. He attained parinibbāna and died at Senārāma monastery. His death is described as:

References 

Buddhas